The Girl from Nagasaki is a 2013 romantic musical drama film directed by Michel Comte. The film had its premiere as the closing night film of the 2013 Naples International Film Festival on November 9, 2013. The film later screened at the 2014 Sundance Film Festival on January 18, 2014.

Plot

The film is a reworking of Puccini's opera Madama Butterfly, in which the tragic heroine is obsessed with an American pilot.

Cast
Mariko Wordell as Cho-Cho San
Edoardo Ponti as Officer Pinkerton
Christopher Lee as Old Officer Pinkerton
Michael Wincott as Goro
Michael Nyqvist as Father Lars
Polina Semionova as Cho-Cho San's Alter Ego
Ayako Yoshida as Suzuki
Robert Evans as U.S. Consul
Clemens Schick as Prince Yamadori
Nobu Matsuhisa as Cho-Cho San's father
Lisa Zane as Jazz singer
Sasha Alexander as Adelaide

Reception
"The Girl from Nagasaki" received mixed reviews from critics. Marshall Fine in his review for Huffington Post said that "staging is avant-garde, bloody and surreal, with elements of modern dance, classical tableaux, kabuki and opera, as well as conventional melodrama. Comte returns often to that staged version to emphasize the action or outline it in a more symbolic way." While, Dan Schindel in his review for Movie Mezzanine said that "Feels like every derisive joke about art house cinema brought to unironic life."

References

External links
 
 

2013 films
2013 romantic drama films
2010s musical films